Pattukottai is a state assembly constituency in Tamil Nadu. It is one of the 234 State Legislative Assembly Constituencies in Tamil Nadu, in India. Elections and Winners from this constituency are listed below.

As per the 2010 draft electoral rolls released by the election commission, the Pattukottai assembly segment comprises 1,77,798 voters (85,476 male and 83,902 female). Besides Pattukkottai Municipality, the Assembly segment includes Madukkur Town Panchayat, Adirampattinam Town Panchayat and a number of villages.

History
Pattukkottai Assembly constituency has been a part of the Thanjavur parliamentary constituency from 2009. Prior to that, it fell within the Pudukkottai constituency.

Madras State

Tamil Nadu

Election results

2021

2016

2011

2006

2001

1996

1991

1989

1984

1980

1977

1971

1967

1962

1957

1952

References 

 

Assembly constituencies of Tamil Nadu